This is a list of films which have placed number one at the weekend box office in the Australia during 2009. All amounts are in Australian dollars.

The week ending 28 December ended in a long weekend.

References
Urban Cinefile – Box Office

See also
List of Australian films – Australian films by year

2009
Australia
2009 in Australian cinema